Manuel Angelilli (born 5 August 1990) is an Italian footballer, who plays as striker for Monterosi FC in Serie D.

Career
In 2009, he was transferred to Pro Vercelli from Milan.

In 2011–12 Serie D, he scored every two games for Città di Marino Calcio.

On 4 July 2012, Reggina Calcio signed Angelilli. On 9 August 2012, he left on loan to Latina.

External links
 Profile at Italian Footballer Association (AIC) (Data provided by football.it) 
 Fullsoccer 
 
 

1990 births
Living people
Italian footballers
Association football forwards
F.C. Pro Vercelli 1892 players
Reggina 1914 players
Latina Calcio 1932 players
L'Aquila Calcio 1927 players
S.E.F. Torres 1903 players
A.S.D. Città di Marino Calcio players
U.S. Viterbese 1908 players
Abano Calcio players
Serie D players
Serie C players